Lionel Aldridge (February 14, 1941 – February 12, 1998) was an American professional football player, a defensive end in the National Football League for 11 seasons with the Green Bay Packers and San Diego Chargers.

Early years
Born in Evergreen, Louisiana, Aldridge was raised by his sharecropper grandparents. After his grandfather's death when Aldridge was 15, he was sent to live with a steelworker uncle in Northern California and played high school football at Pittsburg High School. He earned an athletic scholarship and played college football at Utah State University in Logan, Utah and was co-captain of the team and an All-Skyline Conference tackle.

NFL career
Aldridge was selected in the fourth round of the 1963 NFL draft, 54th overall, by the two-time defending NFL champion Green Bay Packers. One of the few rookies to start for head coach Vince Lombardi, he enjoyed an 11-year NFL career.   As a Packer, he played a role in their unprecedented three straight NFL Championships (1965-66-67) and victories in Super Bowls I and II.  Traded to the San Diego Chargers, Aldridge played two seasons in San Diego before retiring from professional football in 1973.

After football
After retiring, Aldridge worked as sports analyst at WTMJ-TV in Milwaukee and for Packers radio and NBC until manifesting paranoid schizophrenia in the late 1970s. Homeless for a time in part due to misdiagnosis, he eventually reached a form of equilibrium.  He became an advocate for the homeless and the mentally ill until his death in 1998. His advocacy work included serving as a board member for the Mental Health Association of Milwaukee and working as a speaker for the National Alliance on Mental Illness.

References

External links
 
 

1941 births
1998 deaths
American football defensive ends
American sports announcers
Green Bay Packers announcers
Green Bay Packers players
National Football League announcers
People from Avoyelles Parish, Louisiana
People with schizophrenia
Players of American football from Louisiana
San Diego Chargers players
Utah State Aggies football players